The 2020 Georgia Republican presidential primary took place on June 9, 2020, as one of 2 contests scheduled for that day in the Republican Party primaries for the 2020 presidential election.

Results

Results by county

References 

Republican primary
Georgia
May 2020 events in the United States
2020